This is a list of Sim games, their expansion packs, and compilations. Most games were developed by Maxis and published either by Maxis (pre-1997 acquisition by Electronic Arts) or by Electronic Arts (post-1997). EA has marketed and recruited companies such as Bullfrog Productions, Firaxis Games, and Tilted Mill Entertainment to develop several games under the Sim brand.

SimCity series

 SimCity (1989)
 SimCity 2000
 SimCity 64
 SimCity 3000
 SimCity 4
 SimCity 4: Rush Hour
 SimCity DS
 SimCity Societies
 SimCity Societies: Destinations
 SimCity DS 2 (SimCity Creator)
 SimCity Creator
 SimCity Social
 SimCity (2013)
 SimCity: Cities of Tomorrow
 SimCity: Buildit

Compilation packs
 SimCity 2000 Special Edition
 SimCity 3000 Unlimited
 SimCity 4 Deluxe Edition

The Sims series

Other Sim games
 SimEarth
 SimAnt
 SimLife
 SimFarm
 SimRefinery
 SimTower
 SimCopter
 Streets of SimCity
 SimHealth
 SimIsle
 SimTown
 SimPark
 SimGolf
 SimTunes
 SimSafari
 Sim Theme Park (Theme Park World in Europe)
 SimCoaster (Theme Park Inc. in Europe)
 Sid Meier's SimGolf
 The Sims Carnival
 SimAnimals

Compilation packs
 Sim 3-Pack: Tower, Tunes, Isle (Released in 1998 for Windows, it includes SimIsle, SimTower and SimTunes.)
 Sim 3-Pack: Life, Town, Ant (Released in 1998 for Windows, it includes SimAnt, SimTown and SimLife.)
 Sim 3-Pack: Farm, Safari, Earth (Released in 1999 for Windows, it includes SimSafari, SimFarm and SimEarth.)
 Sim Mania (Released in 2000 for Windows, it includes SimCity, SimTower, SimIsle, SimCopter, Streets of SimCity and SimSafari.)
 Sim Mania for Kids (Released in 2000 for Windows, it includes SimTown, SimPark, SimSafari, SimTunes, Widget Workshop and SimAnt.)
 The Sim Collection (Released in 2003 for Windows, it includes SimTheme Park Gold Edition, The Sims Deluxe Edition, SimCity 3000 Unlimited and The Sims Online New & Improved.)
 Sim Mania 2 (Released on March 19, 2003, for Windows, it includes SimCity 3000, SimTheme Park Gold Edition, SimCoaster and Sid Meier's SimGolf.)
 Sim Mania 3 (Released on June 21, 2005, for Windows, it includes SimCopter, SimSafari, SimTheme Park Gold Edition, SimCity 3000 Unlimited, SimCoaster and Sid Meier's SimGolf.)
 The SimCity Box (Released on June 30, 2008, for Windows, it includes SimCity 4 Deluxe Edition, SimCity Societies, SimCity Societies: Destinations, The Sims Carnival SnapCity and Spore Creature Creator.)

Spore

Spore
Spore Galactic Adventures
Spore Creature Creator
Spore Creatures
Spore Origins
Spore Hero
Spore Hero Arena
Darkspore

Canceled games
 SimsVille - Cancelled almost at completion to focus efforts on The Sims 2 development.
 SimMars - Was in development at Maxis around the same time as the release of The Sims. A trailer for the game was included on the SimCity 3000 CD-ROM. From the trailer, the premise of the game seemed to be a human mission to the planet Mars, followed by a terraforming and colonization scenario, typical of the Maxis world-building game style.  The game presumed to be an integration of previous Maxis titles, presented in 3D, possibly including elements of SimEarth, SimLife, and SimCity. On May 12, 2000, Maxis announced that the game was put on hold. A reference and some sound effects were recycled into an arcade game in The Sims Vacation. The game was remade by fans as a complete total conversion mod for SimCity 4, and is in beta 3 phase.
 MySims Social - A game intended to launch on Facebook with The Sims Social and SimCity Social, it never was completed.
 The Urbz 2 - A game intended to surpass The Urbz: Sims in the City, and turn it into a spinoff sub series to The Sims, but the project went through Development Hell after the original game failed to sell to expectations. It was in development first at Maxis for the PlayStation 2, Nintendo Gamecube and Xbox, before being sent over to Electronic Arts Chicago in 2006, where it had some design changes such as being moved to next generation platforms PlayStation 3, Xbox 360 and Nintendo Wii, but the project was cancelled when the studio closed on November 6, 2007, leaving the project incomplete and never released. Assets, logos and other content could be found on The Sims 2 for PlayStation 2's DVD with model viewers, as the game used the same source code and engine as The Urbz 2.

Shut down games
These games are no longer possible to play, as they required connections to servers which no longer exist:
 The Sims Online - Shut down on August 1, 2008.
 The Sims Social - Shut down on June 14, 2013.
 SimCity Social - Shut down on June 14, 2013.
 Darkspore - Shut down on March 1, 2016.
Additionally, online modes for The Sims Bustin' Out and the PC version of MySims ceased August 1, 2008 and June 2011 respectively.

See also
 List of Maxis games
 List of simulation video games

References

Maxis Sim games
Sim
Video game franchises
Sim